Hallington is a hamlet and former civil parish about 9 miles from Hexham, now in the parish of Whittington, in the county of Northumberland, England. In 1951 the parish had a population of 75.

History 
The name "Hallington" means 'Holy valley'. There are no remains of the deserted medieval village of Hallington above ground. Hallington was formerly called "Haledon" and "Halydon". Hallington was formerly a township in St. John Lee parish, from 1866 Hallington was a civil parish in its own right until it was abolished on 1 April 1955 to form Whittington.

See also 
 Hallington Reservoirs

References 

Hamlets in Northumberland
Former civil parishes in Northumberland